No More Night is the forty-first album by American singer/guitarist Glen Campbell, released in 1985 (see 1985 in music).

Track listing

Side 1:

 "No More Night" (Walt Harrah) – 4:01
 "Good Side of Tomorrow" (Dave Loggins) – 2:25
 "When All Of God's Singers Get Home" (Arranged by Glen Campbell) – 3:12
 "Jesus Is His Name" (T.J. Kuenster) – 2:16
 "Trust in God and Do the Right" (Arranged by Glen Campbell) – 2:45
 
Side 2:
 
 "Suffer Little Children" (Micheal Smotherman) – 4:15 (duet with Johnny Cash)
 "Who Will Sing One More Song" (Arranged by Glen Campbell) – 2:12
 "Before There Could Be Me" (Jimmy Webb) – 2:17
 "Overflow" (Wayne Berry) – 3:01
 "You Ask Me How I Know" (Arranged by Glen Campbell) – 3:07

Personnel
Glen Campbell – vocals
T.J. Kuenster – piano
Craig Fall – acoustic guitars and electric guitars
Brent Rowan – electric guitar
Kim Darigan – bass guitar 
Mike Brignardello – bass guitar
Steve Turner – drums
Shane Keister – synthesizer
Dave Huntsinger – synthesizer
The "A" Strings – strings
Woodmont Baptist Choir, Bergen White, Diane Tidwell, Lisa Silver – background vocals

Production
Glen Campbell – producer
Ken Harding – producer
T.J. Kuenster – track arrangements
Bergen White – string arrangements
Jim Cotton – engineer
Rick McCollister – engineer
Joe Scaife – engineer
Lee Peterzell – engineer
Joe Funderburk – engineer
Greg Parker – engineer
Paul Goldberg – engineer
Mark Tucker – photography

Accolades
GMA Dove Awards

References

Glen Campbell albums
1985 albums
Word Records albums